John Stevens (born 1947) is a Buddhist priest, teacher of Buddhist studies and Aikido teacher.

Stevens formerly taught Eastern philosophy at Tohoku Fukushi University in Japan. His Aikido rank is 7th dan Aikikai. He lived in Sendai from 1973 to 2013.
He currently resides in Honolulu, Hawaii where he instructs at Aikido-Ohana dojo.

Biography

John Stevens was born in Chicago but grew up in Evanston, Illinois. He moved to Sendai in Japan in 1973 in order to study Buddhism and began practising Aikido soon afterwards. He practiced under Hanzawa Yoshimi Sensei and then under Shirata Rinjiro Sensei (白田林二郎).

He has created his own system of Aikido, which he calls Classical Aikido, which is a complete system emphasizing misogi, kotodama, and the unity of aiki-ken, aiki-jo, and taijutsu (body arts). He has taught it all over the world.

Bibliography
Stevens has written over thirty books on Buddhism, Aikido and Asian culture, including:

 Training with the Master – Lessons with Morihei Ueshiba  (2004 Edition)
 Zen Brushwork: Focusing the Mind With Calligraphy and Painting
 Lust for Enlightenment: Buddhism and Sex 
 The Sword of No-Sword: Life of the Master Warrior Tesshu 
 The Secrets of Aikido  (1997 Edition)
 Abundant Peace 
 Aikido: The Way of Harmony 
 Invincible Warrior  (1999 Edition)
 Zen Bow, Zen Arrow (2012) 
 Marathon Monks of Mount Hiei (Shambhala 1988, Echo Point Books 2013 paperback)
 The Philosophy of Aikido (2013 paperback edition) 
 Extraordinary Zen Masters: A Maverick, a Master of Masters, and a Wandering Poet (2013 paperback edition) 
 Sacred Calligraphy of the East (2013 paperback edition) 
 The Way of Judo: A Portrait of Jigoro Kano (2013) 
 Three Budo Masters (1995) 
 The Shambhala Guide to Aikido (1996) 
 Budo Secrets (2001)

Translations and collections 
 The Art of Peace  (2011 Edition)
 Best Aikido: The Fundamentals (Illustrated Japanese Classics) 
 The Aikido Master Course: Best Aikido 2 
 Budo Secrets 
 Dewdrops on a Lotus Leaf: Zen Poems of Ryokan	
 One Robe, One Bowl: The Zen Poetry of Ryokan	
 Wild Ways: Zen Poems of Ikkyu (Companions for the Journey)	
 Lotus Moon: The Poetry of Rengetsu (Companions for the Journey) 
 Rengetsu: Life and Poetry of Lotus Moon 
 Mountain Tasting: Zen Haiku by Santoka Taneda 
 The Heart of Aikido: The Philosophy of Takemusu Aiki by Morihei Ueshiba 
 The Essence of Aikido:  The Teachings of Morihei Ueshiba (1993)

References

External links
 Books by John Stevens Shambhala Publications

1947 births
Living people
American aikidoka
American Buddhists
American martial arts writers
Buddhist writers
People from Evanston, Illinois
Sportswriters from Illinois